A blue note is a musical note played or sung lower than the corresponding note on a major scale.

Blue note may also refer to:

Music
 The Blue Note (Columbia, Missouri), a rock, jazz, and pop music venue, established in 1980
 Blue Note Jazz Club, a chain of music clubs and restaurants, with branches in New York, Tokyo, Nagoya, and Milan
 Blue Note Jazz Festival, an annual festival in New York hosted by the jazz club, since 2011
 Blue Note Records, a record label which focuses on jazz music
 , a Chicago jazz venue open from 1947 to 1960
 , a Parisian jazz venue from 1958 to 1966

Other uses
 The logo of the St. Louis Blues hockey team
 Blue note (aviation), the distinctive whine produced by some jet aircraft, as well as the sound of their engines and airframe noise
"Blue Note", the nineteenth episode and Season 2 penultimate of Freeform's live-action show of Marvel's Cloak & Dagger

See also
 The Blue Notes (disambiguation)